The Agriculture and Food Agency (AFA) is the agency of the Council of Agriculture of the Taiwan (ROC) handling affairs related to agriculture in Taiwan.

Organizational structure

Operational divisions
Planning Division
Crop Production Division
Farm Chemicals and Machinery Division
Marketing and Processing Division
Food Industry Division
Food Warehousing and Transportation Division

Administrative divisions
Secretariat
Civil Service Ethics Office
Statistics Office
Accounting Office
Personnel Office

Branches
Northern Regional Office in Taoyuan City
Central Regional Office in Changhua County
Southern Regional Office in Tainan City
Eastern Regional Office in Hualien County

List of directors
 Li Tsang-lang (17 June 2011 -?)
 Hu Jong-i (incumbent)

Transportation
The agency is accessible within walking distance East from Shandao Temple Station of Taipei Metro.

See also
 Agriculture in Taiwan

References

External links
 

Agriculture in Taiwan
Executive Yuan
Organizations based in Nantou County